Tapirus veroensis, commonly called the vero tapir, is an extinct tapir species that lived in the areas of modern-day Florida, Georgia, Kansas, Missouri, and Tennessee. Tapirus veronensis is thought to have gone extinct around 11,000 years ago.

History 
The first complete skull with full dentition of T. veroensis fossil was found at Vero Beach, Florida, in 1915 and named in 1918 by the Florida State Geologist E. H. Sellards.  Fragmentary specimens had been described by Leidy as early as 1852.

Physical characteristics 

Tapirus veroensis fossils found in Northern Alabama were with caribou and peccary fossils, which implies that T. veroensis was capable of living in a temperate climate with subfreezing temperatures. T. veronensis was most similar to the extant mountain tapir. As with all tapir species, T. veroensis had a proboscis used for grabbing branches to eat foliage. They were herbivores, living on a diet of forest vegetation. They most likely weighed over 600 pounds (270 kilograms) and would have been capable of fending off large predators.

Taxonomy 
There are multiple pieces of evidence which indicate most, if not all, of the 5 accepted Pleistocene tapir species found in North America (T. californicus, T. haysii (T. copei), T. lundeliusi, T. merriami, T. veroensis) may actually belong to the same species. T. californicus was considered to be a subspecies of T. haysii by Merriam, T. californicus and T. veroensis are nearly impossible to distinguish morphologically and occupy the same time frame, being separated only by location, and T. haysii, T. veroensis, and T. lundeliusi are already considered so closely related that they occupy the same subgenus (Helicotapirus). Additionally, few details distinguish T. haysii and T. veroensis except size, date, and wear of teeth; and the intermediate sizes overlap greatly with many specimens originally assigned to one species, then later switched over to another.

References 

Prehistoric tapirs